Torben Rhein (born 12 January 2003) is a German professional footballer who plays as a midfielder for Austrian Bundesliga club Austria Lustenau, on loan from Bayern Munich II. He was included in The Guardian's "Next Generation 2020".

Career statistics

Club

Notes

Honours
Individual
Fritz Walter Medal U17 Silver: 2020

References

2003 births
Footballers from Berlin
Living people
German footballers
Germany youth international footballers
Association football midfielders
Hertha BSC players
FC Bayern Munich footballers
FC Bayern Munich II players
SC Austria Lustenau players
3. Liga players
Regionalliga players
Austrian Football Bundesliga players
German expatriate footballers
Expatriate footballers in Austria
German expatriate sportspeople in Austria